Agnès Bénassy-Quéré (born 15 March 1966) is a French economist who has been serving as chief economist at the Direction générale du Trésor (or French Treasury) since 2020. She is also a professor of economics at the Paris School of Economics.

Career 
Bénassy-Quéré's research interests include the international monetary systems, exchange rates, economic policy, and the European integration. 

Bénassy-Quéré worked for the Ministry of the Economy and Finance before moving to academic positions successively at Cergy-Pontoise University (1993-1996), Lille 2 (1996-1999), Paris-Ouest (2000-2004) and École Polytechnique (2009-2011).

In addition, Bénassy-Quéré also served as a deputy director (1998-2006) and as director (2006-2012) of the Centre d'Etudes Prospectives et d'Informations Internationales (CEPII).

Recognition 
Bénassy-Quéré's research was awarded Best Young French Economist Award by Cercle des économistes and Le Monde in 2000 (together with Bruno Amable).

Other activities 
 Bruegel, Member of the Board
 CESifo, Research Network Fellow
 German Institute for Economic Research (DIW), Member of the Scientific Advisory Board

References

External links
Profile of Agnès Bénassy-Quéré on the website of the Paris School of Economics
Personal webpage of Agnès Bénassy-Quéré

1966 births
Living people
French women economists
French economists
International economists
Academic staff of the Paris School of Economics
ESCP Europe alumni
Paris Dauphine University alumni
Chevaliers of the Légion d'honneur
Knights of the Ordre national du Mérite
People from Paris